Fadhl Omar is Qatari footballer who plays as a midfielder. He has a brother, Mohammed Omar, who is also a footballer. He is a member of the Qatar national football team.

References

External links
Player profile - QSL.com.qa

1989 births
Living people
Qatar SC players
Al Ahli SC (Doha) players
Umm Salal SC players
Al-Shamal SC players
Qatar Stars League players
Qatari Second Division players
Qatari people of Yemeni descent
Place of birth missing (living people)
Qatari footballers
Qatar international footballers
Association football midfielders